The Consulate General of Canada in Chicago is a Government of Canada diplomatic mission responsible for Canadian interests in the states of Illinois, Missouri, Wisconsin, northwestern Indiana and the Kansas City metro area.  The Consulate General is part of a worldwide network of Canadian diplomatic and trade offices, including more than 15 across the United States. In the Midwest, Canada accounts for more than 35% of the region's international trade. Canada is the largest export market for Illinois, Missouri and Wisconsin, larger than Mexico, China, Brazil, Australia and Japan combined. The Midwest–Canada trade relationship is worth more than $60 billion annually and supports more than 650,000 Midwest jobs. Canada is also the largest foreign supplier of oil, natural gas, electricity and uranium to the U.S. The trade partnership, along with an integral energy relationship, a shared responsibility for the Great Lakes and the environment, and the vast cultural, academic and tourism ties between the two countries, are just a few examples of why the Canada–U.S. relationship is so beneficial and meaningful to both nations. The mission's 27 staff members in Chicago work to further this relationship by promoting Canada's interests in this region through stronger trade and economic ties, as well as enhanced political, academic and cultural links between Canada and the Midwest. The Consulate General also provides consular assistance to Canadians who are visiting or living in the accredited territory.

Current and former Canadian Consuls General in Chicago 
 Edmond Turcotte (November 10, 1947) – the first consul-general
 Douglas S. Cole (August 1, 1950 –)
 Frederick H. Palmer (February 1, 1955 –)
 Gerald A. Newman (April 15, 1957 – October 16, 1960)
 Charles F. Wilson (April 7, 1960 – December 31, 1964)
 Stanley V. Allen (January 29, 1965 – June 19, 1969)
 Leland H. Ausman (June 17, 1969 – April 1, 1970)
 Robert D. Sirrs (April 1, 1970 – August 15, 1971)
 John Timmerman (August 25, 1971 – September 5, 1974)
 Wilmer J. Collett (May 8, 1974 – July 9, 1979)
 James H. Stone (April 4, 1979 – May 1, 1980)
 Robert H. Gaynor (1980–1984)
 Anthony Halliday (1984–1989)
 Douglas Valentine (August 24, 1989 –)
 Allan Lever (December 15, 1993–)
 J. C. Poole (July 10, 1997–)
 Georges Rioux (August 14, 2006 – August 21, 2011)
 Gitane De Silva (December 15, 2011 – January 16, 2014)
 Roy Norton (January 17, 2014 – March 12, 2017)
 John Cruickshank (March 13, 2017 – 2020)

References

External links
 Canadian Consulate General in Chicago

1947 in international relations
Canada
Chicago
Organizations based in Chicago
Canada–United States relations
1947 establishments in Illinois